The 1922–23 season was the 14th year of football played by Dundee Hibernian, and covers the period from 1 July 1922 to 30 June 1923. It was the last full season in which the team played under its original name.

Match results
Dundee Hibernian played a total of 33 matches during the 1922–23 season.

Legend

All results are written with Dundee Hibernian's score first.
Own goals in italics

Scottish Football Alliance

Eastern League

Scottish Cup

References

Dundee United F.C. seasons
Dundee Hibernian